Adoxaceae, commonly known as moschatel family, is a small family of flowering plants in the order Dipsacales, now consisting of five genera and about 150–200 species. They are characterised by opposite toothed leaves, small five- or, more rarely, four-petalled flowers in cymose inflorescences, and the fruit being a drupe. They are thus similar to many Cornaceae.

In older classifications, this entire family was part of Caprifoliaceae, the honeysuckle family.  Adoxa (moschatel) was the first plant to be moved to this new group.  Much later, the genera Sambucus (elders) and Viburnum were added after careful morphological analysis and biochemical tests by the Angiosperm Phylogeny Group.  An additional monotypic genus Sinadoxa has been added based on molecular comparison with Adoxa.

Recent sources, including the Angiosperm Phylogeny Website, treat this family as Viburnaceae Raf., nom. cons.

Adoxa is a small perennial herbaceous plant, flowering early in the spring and dying down to ground level in summer immediately after the berries are mature; the leaves are compound.

The elders are mostly shrubs, but two species are large herbaceous plants; all have compound leaves. The viburnums are all shrubs, with simple leaves.

Gallery

References

External links
 Adoxaceae of Mongolia in FloraGREIF
 Adoxaceae in BoDD – Botanical Dermatology Database

 
Asterid families
Flora of Pakistan